John Pinch (2 December 1870 – 3 March 1946) was an English rugby union footballer who played in the 1890s. He played at representative level for England, and at club level for Lancaster, as a forward, e.g. front row, lock, or back row. Prior to the 1901–02 season, Lancaster was a rugby union club.

Background
John Pinch was born in Lancaster, Lancashire, and he died aged 75 in Lancaster, Lancashire.

Playing career

International honours
John Pinch won caps for England while at Lancaster in 1896 against Wales, and Ireland, in 1897 against Scotland.

Change of Code
When Lancaster converted from the rugby union code to the rugby league code for the 1901–02 season, John Pinch would have been approximately 31 years of age. Consequently, he may have been both a rugby union and rugby league footballer for Lancaster.

References

External links
Search for "Pinch" at rugbyleagueproject.org
Search for "John Pinch" at britishnewspaperarchive.co.uk

1870 births
1946 deaths
England international rugby union players
English rugby union players
Lancaster RFC players
Rugby union forwards
Rugby union players from Lancaster